John Reginald Bartley (born 15 September 1958) is an English former professional footballer who played in the English Football League as a forward.

Sources
Profile at Neil Brown

1958 births
Living people
Footballers from Camberwell
English footballers
Association football forwards
Welling United F.C. players
Millwall F.C. players
Maidstone United F.C. (1897) players
Chelmsford City F.C. players
Dartford F.C. players
Erith & Belvedere F.C. players
English Football League players
Alma Swanley F.C. players
English expatriate footballers
Expatriate footballers in Finland